Anopina albomaculana is a moth of the family Tortricidae. It is found in Sinaloa, Mexico.

References

Moths described in 2000
albomaculana
Moths of Central America